Westfield F.C. may refer to:

 Westfield F.C. (Surrey), an English association football club based in Woking
 Westfield F.C. (Sussex), an English association football club based near Hastings

See also 
 Westfields F.C., an English association football club based in Hereford